109 Squadron or 109th Squadron may refer to:

 109th Signals Squadron, Royal Australian Corps of Signals
 109th Squadron (Iraq)
 109 Squadron (Israel)
 109 Squadron SAAF, South Africa
 No. 109 Squadron RAF, United Kingdom
 109th Airlift Squadron, United States Air Force
 VPB-109, United States Navy